Buck Henry (born Henry Zuckerman; December 9, 1930 – January 8, 2020) was an American actor, screenwriter, and director. Henry's contributions to film included his work as a co-writer for Mike Nichols's The Graduate (1967) for which he received a nomination for the Academy Award for Best Adapted Screenplay. He also appeared in Nichols' Catch-22 (1970), Herbert Ross' The Owl and the Pussycat (1970), and Peter Bogdanovich's What's Up, Doc? (1972). In 1978, he co-directed Heaven Can Wait (1978) with Warren Beatty receiving a nomination for the Academy Award for Best Director. He later appeared in Albert Brooks' Defending Your Life (1991), and the Robert Altman films The Player (1992) and Short Cuts (1993). 

His long career began on television with work on shows with Steve Allen in The New Steve Allen Show (1961). He co-created Get Smart (1965–1970) with Mel Brooks for which he received the Primetime Emmy Award for Outstanding Writing for a Comedy Series. He also served as a multiple time host of Saturday Night Live. Henry is a member of SNL's Five Timer's Club having hosted 10 times from 1976 to 1980. He later guest-starred in such popular shows as Murphy Brown, Hot in Cleveland, Will & Grace, and 30 Rock.

Early life 
Henry was born in New York City as Henry Zuckerman. His mother was Ruth Taylor (January 13, 1905 – April 12, 1984), a silent film actress, star of the original version of Gentlemen Prefer Blondes, and his father was Paul Steinberg Zuckerman (April 15, 1899 – December 3, 1965), an Air Force brigadier general and stockbroker. Though the young Zuckerman was nicknamed 'Buck' from childhood, he did not officially change his name to Buck Henry until the 1970s; both his birth name and nickname came from his grandfather. Henry was from a Jewish background.

Henry attended The Choate School, at the time an all-boys institution (now Choate Rosemary Hall). At 15 years old, he made his professional acting debut in a Broadway production of Life with Father, which later toured theaters in Brooklyn, Long Island, and the Bronx. Henry earned a bachelor's degree in English literature and a senior fellowship in writing at Dartmouth College in New Hampshire, where he wrote for the university humor magazine, the Dartmouth Jack-O-Lantern, and met movie director Bob Rafelson.

Following graduation, he enlisted in the Army during the Korean War. He served in West Germany first as a helicopter mechanic and then transferred to Special Services, where he toured with the Seventh Army Repertory Company, performing in a play he both wrote and directed.

Career

Acting and writing 
Henry joined the improvisational comedy group the Premise, whose ranks included George Segal and Theodore J. Flicker, performing in the West Village in Manhattan. This helped lead him into a television career.

From 1959 to 1962, as part of an elaborate hoax by comedian Alan Abel, he made public appearances as G. Clifford Prout, the quietly outraged president of the Society for Indecency to Naked Animals, who presented his point of view on talk shows. The character of Prout wished to clothe all animals in order to prevent their 'indecency', using slogans such as "A nude horse is a rude horse". Henry played the character with deadpan sincerity. He was often presented as an eccentric, but was otherwise taken seriously by the broadcasters who interviewed him. "Prout" received many letters of support from TV viewers, and even some unsolicited monetary donations, all of which were invariably returned, as neither Henry nor Abel (who had no intention of following through on the Society's stated aims) wanted to be accused of raising money fraudulently.

Henry became a cast member on The New Steve Allen Show (1961) and the US version of That Was the Week That Was (1964–1965).

He was a co-creator and writer for the secret agent comedy television series Get Smart (1965–1970), with comedian Mel Brooks. The show lasted for five seasons and 138 episodes and won numerous Emmy Awards. Two TV projects created by Henry had short runs: Captain Nice (1967) with William Daniels as a reluctant superhero, and Quark (1978), with Richard Benjamin in command of a garbage scow in outer space.

Henry shared an Oscar nomination with Calder Willingham for their screenplay for The Graduate (1967), in which he also appeared in a supporting role as a hotel concierge. Henry's cameo in The Player (1992) had him (playing himself) pitching a 25-years-later sequel to The Graduate, which Henry later claimed led to real-life interest in such a project from some studios.

His many other screen writing credits included the sex farce Candy (1968), the romantic comedies The Owl and the Pussycat (1970) and What's Up, Doc? (1972), the satire Catch-22 (1970), the thriller The Day of the Dolphin (1973), the comedy Protocol (1984), and the dark crime dramedy To Die For (1995). In several of these, such as Candy and Catch-22, he also appeared as an actor. In 1997, Henry was the recipient of the Austin Film Festival's Distinguished Screenwriter Award.

Overall he appeared in more than 40 films, including a lead role in Taking Off (1971) and supporting roles in The Man Who Fell to Earth (1976), Gloria (1980), Eating Raoul (1982), Aria (1987), Tune in Tomorrow (1990), Defending Your Life (1991), Short Cuts (1993), and Grumpy Old Men (1993).

He co-directed Heaven Can Wait (1978), the remake of Here Comes Mr. Jordan, with the movie's star Warren Beatty and appeared in the film as an officious angel, reprising the character originally played by Edward Everett Horton. Henry received a second shared Oscar nomination, this time for Best Director.

Later in his career, Henry became known for guest-starring and recurring roles on television. He appeared in an episode of Murphy Brown ("My Dinner With Einstein", 1989) as Dr. Victor Rudman, a fractal scientist who dated Murphy. He appeared on the television show Will & Grace in 2005. In 2007, he made two guest appearances on The Daily Show as a contributor, billed as the show's "Senior Senior Correspondent". He has also appeared as Liz Lemon's father, Dick Lemon, in the 30 Rock episodes "Ludachristmas" (December 13, 2007) and "Gentleman's Intermission" (November 4, 2010). In 2011, he appeared in a multi-episode arc of Hot in Cleveland as Elka's groom.

His Broadway credits included the 2002 revival of Morning's at Seven. Off-Broadway in July 2009, he starred opposite Holland Taylor in Mother, a play by Lisa Ebersole.

Saturday Night Live 
Henry hosted NBC's Saturday Night Live ten times between 1976 and 1980, making him the show's most frequent host during its initial five-year run. It became a tradition during these years for Henry to host the final show of each season, beginning with the 1976–1977 season. Henry's frequent host record was broken when Steve Martin made his 11th appearance as host of the show on the finale episode of the 1988–1989 season. During the episode of October 30, 1976, Henry was injured in the forehead by John Belushi's katana in the samurai sketch. Henry's head began to bleed and he was forced to wear a large bandage on his forehead for the rest of the show. As a gag, the members of the SNL cast each wore a bandage on their foreheads as well.

Recurring characters on SNL
Howard, a sadistic stunt coordinator.
Marshall DiLaMuca, father of Bill Murray's character Todd in The Nerds sketches.
Mr. Dantley, the straight man and frequent customer of Samurai Futaba's (John Belushi) many businesses.
Uncle Roy, a single, pedophilic babysitter. The three skits, written by Rosie Shuster and Anne Beatts, remain controversial.

Celebrity impersonations on SNL
Charles Lindbergh
John Dean
Ron Nessen

Death
Henry died of a heart attack at Cedars-Sinai Medical Center in Los Angeles on January 8, 2020, at age 89.

Filmography

Film
Source: Turner Classic Movies

Television
Source: IMDb

Writing credits

Film
Source: Turner Classic Movies
The Troublemaker (1964) (with Theodore J. Flicker)
The Graduate (1967) (with Calder Willingham)
Candy (1968)
Catch-22 (1970)
The Owl and the Pussycat (1970)
Is There Sex After Death? (1971) (Uncredited)
What's Up, Doc? (1972) (with Peter Bogdanovich, Robert Benton and David Newman)
The Day of the Dolphin (1973)
Heaven Can Wait (1978)
First Family (1980)
Protocol (1984)
To Die For (1995)
Town & Country (2001)
The Humbling (2014) (with Michal Zebede)

Television
That Was the Week That Was (1964) (3 episodes)
Captain Nice (1967) (2 episodes) (creator)
Get Smart (1965–1970) (co-creator)
Quark (1978) (creator, 7 episodes)
The New Show (1984) (TV) (5 episodes)
Alfred Hitchcock Presents (1985) (1 episode "Wake Me When I'm Dead")
Trying Times (1989) (TV) (director)
Tales from the Crypt (1992) (1 episode)
Great Railway Journeys (1996) (1 episode)
Dilbert (2000) (1 episode)

Directing credits
I Miss Sonja Henie (1971) (Short film)
Heaven Can Wait (1978) (with Warren Beatty)
First Family (1980)
Trying Times (1989) (TV) (director)

Awards and nominations 
Academy Awards

Golden Globe Awards

Primetime Emmy Awards

Other Awards

References

External links

1930 births
2020 deaths
American male film actors
Film directors from New York City
American male screenwriters
Best Screenplay BAFTA Award winners
Choate Rosemary Hall alumni
Dartmouth College alumni
Primetime Emmy Award winners
Male actors from New York City
Writers Guild of America Award winners
Jewish American screenwriters
Screenwriters from New York (state)
Jewish American male actors
United States Army personnel of the Korean War
Military personnel from New York City
Jewish American male comedians
Burials at Forest Lawn Memorial Park (Hollywood Hills)
Volpi Cup winners
21st-century American Jews